Ana Cruz is a civil servant and lobbyist at Ballard Partners Tampa, Florida. She was the first Hispanic person to serve as executive director of the Florida Democratic Party and served as spokesperson for Hillary Clinton’s Presidential Campaigns in 2008 and 2016. Ana Cruz is known as “Tampa’s First Lady”, partner of Tampa Mayor, Jane Castor.

Lobbying career
Ana Cruz is a managing partner at Ballard Partners, Florida’s largest bipartisan lobbying firm. As a lobbyist, she has built coalitions between government and businesses, professional sports teams, hospitals and technology companies. Cruz worked to attract technology startups to Tampa. She lobbied for Verizon’s integration of their FTTP technology in Tampa and Hillsborough County in 2006 and for Uber ride-sharing to be permitted in the Tampa area and securing federal funding for 'Connected Vehicles' in Tampa. Ana Cruz is assigned by her firm to direct government affairs in Washington D.C. where she is working with the Biden administration on implementing progressive policies.

Political career 
Ana Cruz managed her first campaign and worked various staff positions for Bill Clinton, Al Gore and Senator Bill Nelson. Ana Cruz served for two years as the executive director of the Florida Democratic Party, making her the youngest person and first hispanic person to serve in the role. Ana Cruz was a Hillary Clinton Campaign spokesperson in 2008 and 2016 and Joe Biden Campaign advisor in 2020, serving on the DNC’s Convention Platform Committee as a representative for Joe Biden.

Committees and awards 
Ana Cruz serves on the Board of The Greater Tampa Bay Chamber of Commerce Board, the Athena Society, the 51st Superbowl Committee. Ana Cruz was selected to be in Florida’s Top 100 Most Influential by Florida Politics Magazine in 2020 and 2021.

References

Living people
American lobbyists
LGBT people from Florida
Florida Democrats
Year of birth missing (living people)